The Golovec District, or simply Golovec, is a district of the City Municipality of Ljubljana, the capital of Slovenia. It encompasses Golovec Hill, which dates back to the Carboniferous period and consists of clastic rock (siltstone, claystone and sandstone).

External links

Golovec District on Geopedia

 
Districts of Ljubljana